Conus spiceri is a species of sea snail, a marine gastropod mollusk in the family Conidae, the cone snails, cone shells or cones.

These snails are predatory and venomous. They are capable of "stinging" humans.

Description
The size of the shell varies between 45 mm and 152 mm.

Distribution
This marine species occurs in the Pacific Ocean off Hawaii and Midway.

References

  Bartsch & Rehder (1943), New cones from the Hawaiian Islands; Proceedings of the Biological Society of Washington. v.56, 1943
 Severns, M. (2011). Shells of the Hawaiian Islands - The Sea Shells. Conchbooks, Hackenheim. 564 pp.
 Puillandre N., Duda T.F., Meyer C., Olivera B.M. & Bouchet P. (2015). One, four or 100 genera? A new classification of the cone snails. Journal of Molluscan Studies. 81: 1-23

External links
 To World Register of Marine Species
 Cone Shells - Knights of the Sea
 

spiceri
Gastropods described in 1943